Joyce Azzam (Arabic: جويس عزام) is a Lebanese elite mountaineer born on June 24, 1984. Azzam holds the record of being the only Lebanese woman to complete the Seven Summits Challenge . She graduated with a Ph.D. in landscape and environment from the Sapienza University of Rome. Azzam now runs an NGO called MounTurtle. She is the first Lebanese woman and one of the few Arab women to complete and raise the Lebanese flag on top of the Seven Summits after reaching the top Everest in May 2019.

Biography 
Joyce Azzam was born during the Lebanese Civil War in the capital city of Lebanon, Beirut. She suffers from a chronic lung condition and hypermobility syndrome. Azzam's childhood was very unstable and filled with obstacles. All she can remember is moving from bunker to bunker, continuously living underground. Moreover, she was never into sports due to her medical condition called "hyperlaxity" (joints in the legs are loose and the knees bend backward). She also has a fear from heights, known as Acrophobia. She was always bullied at school because of her disease, but this did not deter her from achieving her goals, so she decided to start running everyday, and adopted the phrase "nothing is impossible."

Career 
Joyce Azzam pursued both her higher studies in Architecture at the Lebanese University and her career as a Conservation architect between Rome & Los Angeles. She earned a Ph.D. in Landscape and Environment from the Sapienza University of Rome, as well as 3 Master's degrees, one in Conservation of Historic Cities and Buildings, another in Governance Models and Management of Local Public System, and a final one in Architecture.

She has become an advocate for women's and children's rights. She is featured as an expert or motivational speaker for the international circuit promoting her causes of inspiring youth and women to overcome life and societal challenges. She said, "Nobody expected me to be a mountaineer, but I welcomed the contrast, as it challenged stereotypes of what a woman should be." Furthermore, Azzam has become the ambassador of the Lebanese Ice Hockey Federation (women's team) supporting women in sports and has volunteered with the NGO "Himaya" as a child protection advocate and has been a motivational speaker for youth groups in many other countries. In the spring of 2022, Azzam became the ambassador of The Lebanese Mountain Trail and  has walked the full trail from north to south.

On 23 May 2019, she successfully climbed Mount Everest thus becoming the third Lebanese person and fourth Arab woman to achieve the feat. While also accomplishing her  summit of Mount Everest, she also completed the Seven Summits challenge in the due course. She became the first Lebanese woman to complete Seven Summits and to have previously climbed Denali in North America, Kilimanjaro in Africa, Elbrus in Europe, Puncak Jaya & Mount Kosciuszko in Oceania, Aconcagua in South America and Vinson Massif in Antarctica. She also faced financial difficulties and obstacles in 2015 when she was left with a lack of funds to complete the Seven Summits challenge and initially abandoned the plan.

Joyce Azzam went through intensive training of more than 20 hours per week. She was Himaya's ambassador and visits schools regularly to share her story and upcoming plans with more than 1000 children and community members. Her main objective is to inspire the younger generations to pursue their dreams without fear and to be bold. She faced many tribulations, especially from her family who used to tell her, every time she came from a trip, that she is not acting like a girl, that she should be married and planning for her kids’ future instead. “I'm sure they don't ask male mountaineers if they're married,” said Azzam. She has a motto she goes by which is: “Just like a Mountain Turtle, I go slowly but surely. I carry my home on my back and my Country in my heart.” Joyce Azzam admitted that this field is generally male-oriented, but it's easier to become a mountaineer in Europe or the US.  She told Annahar, “In Lebanon, I'm a pioneer because I'm breaking away from the trail and achieving something new here," and “I want to do this for Lebanon. I want to break this record for Lebanon since it's my home."

References 

Living people
Summiters of Mount Everest
Summiters of the Seven Summits
Lebanese activists
Lebanese architects
Lebanese mountain climbers
Sportspeople from Beirut
Lebanese University alumni
1984 births